Psacadina is a genus of flies in the family Sciomyzidae, the marsh flies or snail-killing flies.

Species
P. disjecta Enderlein, 1939
P. kaszabi Elberg, 1978
P. verbekei Rozkosny, 1975
P. vittigera (Schiner, 1864)
P. zernyi (Mayer, 1953)

References

Sciomyzidae
Sciomyzoidea genera